Moczydła may refer to the following places:
Moczydła, Pajęczno County in Łódź Voivodeship (central Poland)
Moczydła, Radomsko County in Łódź Voivodeship (central Poland)
Moczydła, Masovian Voivodeship (east-central Poland)
Moczydła, Czarnków-Trzcianka County in Greater Poland Voivodeship (west-central Poland)
Moczydła, Koło County in Greater Poland Voivodeship (west-central Poland)
Moczydła, Turek County in Greater Poland Voivodeship (west-central Poland)
Moczydła, Pomeranian Voivodeship (north Poland)